In human mitochondrial genetics,  Haplogroup A is a human mitochondrial DNA (mtDNA) haplogroup.

Origin

Haplogroup A is believed to have arisen in Asia some 30,000–50,000 years BC. Its ancestral haplogroup was Haplogroup N. However, the extant diversity of mitochondrial genomes that belong to Haplogroup A is low relative to the degree of divergence from its nearest outgroups in haplogroup N, which suggests that extant members of Haplogroup A might be descended from a population that has emerged from a bottleneck approximately 20,000 years ago.

Its highest frequencies are among Native Americans, its largest overall population is in East Asia, and its greatest variety (which suggests its origin point) is in East Asia. Thus, it might have originated in and spread from the Far East.

Distribution
Its subclade A2 shares a T16362C mutation with subclades A1 (found in Japan, Tashkurgan, Veliky Novgorod, Mongols, and Altaians), A6 (found in Tibet and in the Yangtze River basin), A12'23 (found in Siberia and among Uralic and Turkic peoples), A13'14 (found in southern Siberia, Xinjiang, Ladakh, China, Yunnan, Thailand, and Vietnam), A15 (found in China, Naxi, Uyghur, Japan, and among the Sherpa of Tibet and Nepal), A16 (found in Uyghur, Buryat, Turkey), A17 (found in China, Miao, Yi, Tibet, Ladakh, Kyrgyz, Thailand, and Vietnam), A18 (found in China), A19 (found in China), A20 (found among Han Chinese and in Japan), A21 (found in Tibet and in Jammu and Kashmir), A22 (found in China), A24 (found in Beijing and West Bohemia), A25 (found in Japan and Yakutia), and A26 (found in Denmark). A2 is found in Chukotko–Kamchatka and is also one of five mtDNA haplogroups found in the indigenous peoples of the Americas, the others being B, C, D, and X.

Haplogroup A2 is the most common haplogroup among the Inuit, Na-Dene, and many Amerind ethnic groups of North and Central America. Lineages belonging to haplogroup A2 also comprise the majority of the mtDNA pool of the Inuit and their neighbors, the Chukchis, in northeasternmost Siberia.

Other branches of haplogroup A are less frequent but widespread among other populations of Asia. Haplogroup A5 is rather limited to populations from Korea and Japan southward, though it has been detected as singletons in a pair of large samples of Khamnigans (1/99 = 1.0%) and Buryats (1/295 = 0.3%) from the Buryat Republic.

In Asia, A(xA2) is especially frequent in Tibeto-Burman-speaking populations of Southwest China, such as Tibetans (6/65 = 9.2%, 25/216 = 11.6%, 11/73 = 15.1%). Approximately 7% to 15% of Koreans belong to haplogroup A. Approximately 5% to 12% of the Japanese belong to haplogroup A (including A4, A5, and A(xA4, A5)). Approximately 4% to 13% of Mongols belong to haplogroup A, almost all of whom are contained within the A4 subclade (2/47 = 4.3% Mongolians from Ulan Bator in haplogroup A4, 4/48 = 8.3% Mongols from New Barag Left Banner in haplogroup A(xA5), 6/47 = 12.8% Mongolians from Ulan Bator in haplogroup A4). Approximately 3% to 9% of Chinese people belong to haplogroup A. Haplogroup A also has been found in Vietnamese (2/42 = 4.8%, including one A4 and one A5(xA5a)). Approximately 4% (3/71) of Tatars from Aznakayevo, 3% (4/126) of Tatars from Buinsk, and 2% of Turkish people belong to haplogroup A. Haplogroup A4 has been found in 2.4% (2/82) of a sample of Persians from eastern Iran and in 2.3% (1/44) of a sample of Tajiks from Tajikistan. Haplogroup A is not found among Austronesians. In Nepalese population except Sherpa, haplogroup A was mirrored by its clades, A27, A14 and A17, of which A27 was the most abundant clade in Newar (3.99%). Newly defined clade A27 only discerned so far in Newar and Nepali-mix coalesce at ~ 8.4 Kya suggesting their ancient origin and potentially insitu differentiation in Nepal.

Table of Frequencies of MtDNA Haplogroup A

Subclades

Tree
This phylogenetic tree of haplogroup A subclades is based on the paper by Mannis van Oven and Manfred Kayser Updated comprehensive phylogenetic tree of global human mitochondrial DNA variation and subsequent published research.

A
A(xA5, A8, A10) – China (Han from Wuhan), Buryat (Inner Mongolia)
A+T152C!+T16362C – Uyghur, Korea, Japan, Vietnam (Hmong from Lao Cai Province, Kinh from Hanoi, Cờ Lao)
A1 [TMRCA 12,800 (95% CI 6,500 <-> 22,700) ybp]
A1* – Japan, Korea
A1a [TMRCA 7,500 (95% CI 4,500 <-> 11,800) ybp]
A1a* – Japan (Aichi), Sarikoli (Tashkurgan), USA, England
A1a1 [TMRCA 5,000 (95% CI 2,200 <-> 9,800) ybp]
A1a1* – Buryat, Altai Kizhi
A1a1a – Buryat, Mongol (Inner Mongolia) [TMRCA 1,050 (95% CI 75 <-> 5,500) ybp]
A1a2 – Russia (Bashkortostan, Velikij Novgorod), Iran (Turkmen) [TMRCA 1,950 (95% CI 100 <-> 10,500) ybp]
A1a3 – Greece (Ioannina), United States (West Virginia) [TMRCA 1,150 (95% CI 75 <-> 6,000) ybp]
A2 – Ache, Waiwai, Zoro, Surui, Waiapi, Poturujara, Kayapo, Katuena, Guarani, Arsario, Cayapa, Dogrib, ancient Canada, USA (Pennsylvania, California), Mexico (Zapotec), Cuba, Dominican Republic, Colombia, Venezuela, Ecuador, Peru, Argentina [TMRCA 10,600 (95% CI 9,600 <-> 11,700) ybp]
A2a – Eskimo (Greenland, Chukotka), Chukchi
A2a1 – Inuit (Canada), Selkup
A2a2 – Eskimo (Chukotka), Chukchi
A2a3 – Eskimo (Greenland, Canada, Chukotka), Chukchi
A2a4 – USA (New Mexico, Arizona), Mexico (Chihuahua)
A2a5 – Apache, USA (California, Arizona, New Mexico, Texas), Canada (Cree, Shuswap)
A2b – Chukchi
A2b1 – Chukchi, Koryak, Eskimo (Chukotka, Canada, Greenland)
A2c
A2d – USA (Mexican, Hispanic)
A2d1 – USA (Mexican)
A2d1a – USA (Hispanic)
A2d2 – USA (Hispanic)
A2e'ao
A2e
A2ao
A2ao1
A2f
A2f1 – Newfoundland
A2f1a – Canada, USA (Native American)
A2f2 – USA (Mexican, Hispanic), Mexico
A2f3 – USA (Mexican, Hispanic)
A2g – USA (Mexican, Hispanic), Mexico, Iberian Peninsula
A2g1 – USA (Mexican, Hispanic), Latin America
A2h – Colombia (Cocama of Amazonas, Arhuaco), Yanomama, Kogui
A2h1 – USA (Mexican, Hispanic), Mexico, Latin America
A2i – USA (Hispanic, etc.), Canada (Ojibwa, Prince Edward Island, Pabos in Quebec)
A2j – USA (Hispanic)
A2j1 – USA (Hispanic)
A2k – USA (Puerto Rico)
A2k1 – Ecuador, Wayuu, Mexico
A2k1a – Venezuela, Colombia (Pasto of Putumayo), USA (Hispanic)
A2l'm'n'o'ai'aj
A2l
A2m
A2n – Canada
A2o
A2ai
A2aj
A2p'am
A2p
A2p1
A2p2
A2am – USA (Puerto Rico, Hispanic), Venezuela. One ancient DNA found in Curaçao, in a Dabajuroid (Caquetio) site dating 1160-1500 CE.
A2q
A2q1
A2r – USA (Hispanic, Mexican), Cuba
A2r1 – Mexico, USA (Mexican)
A2s
A2t – USA (Mexican)
A2u
A2u1
A2u2
A2v
A2v1 – USA (Mexican, Hispanic), Mexico (La Mixteca)
A2v1a – Guatemala, USA (Mexican)
A2v1b – Mexico
A2w – Colombia (Kogi, Guambiano of Putumayo), Arsario, USA (Mexican, Hispanic)
A2w1 – Mexico, Cayman Islands, Guatemala (La Tinta), Panama (Guaymi), Colombia
A2x
A2y
A2z – USA (Hispanic, Puerto Rico)
A2aa
A2ab
A2ac
A2ac1
A2ad
A2ad1
A2ad2
A2ae
A2af
A2af1
A2af1a
A2af1a1
A2af1a2
A2af1b
A2af1b1
A2af1b1a
A2af1b1b
A2af1b2
A2af2
A2ag
A2ah
A2ak
A2al
A2an
A2ap
A2aq
A6 [TMRCA 12,000 (95% CI 8,600 <-> 16,100) ybp]
A6* – Deng, Korea
A6a – China [TMRCA 9,600 (95% CI 5,500 <-> 15,500) ybp]
A6a* – Han Chinese (Wuhan, etc.)
A6a1 – Tujia
A6b – Tibet [TMRCA 5,000 (95% CI 2,700 <-> 8,300) ybp]
A6b* – Tibet (Chamdo, Ladakh)
A6b1 – Tibet (Sherpa)
A6c – Tibet (Lhoba, Monpa)
A12'23 – Austria, Romania, Poland, Russia, possibly found among Udmurts and Komis
A12 – Czech Republic, Germany [TMRCA 11,800 (95% CI 6,500 <-> 19,700) ybp]
A12a – Ireland, UK, New Zealand, USA, Nenets, Selkup [TMRCA 4,700 (95% CI 2,700 <-> 7,600) ybp]
A12a* – Mansi, Yakut (Vilyuy River basin), Kyrgyz (Kyrgyzstan)
A12a1 – Kyordyughen Site (Ymyiakhtakh Culture, Yakutia), Hungary (Debrecen) [TMRCA 2,800 (95% CI 1,450 <-> 4,900) ybp]
A12a2 – Evenk (Krasnoyarsk Krai, Stony Tunguska River basin) [TMRCA 1,250 (95% CI 100 <-> 6,600) ybp]
A12b – Buryat, Karos-Eperjesszög (Hungarian conqueror period) [TMRCA 3,000 (95% CI 425 <-> 10,700) ybp]
A23 – Mongol (Inner Mongolia), Buryat, Ket,  Qashqai (Iran), ancient Scythian (Chylenski) [TMRCA 6,200 (95% CI 3,300 <-> 10,600) ybp]
A13'14 – Russia (Buryat, Khamnigan), China (Shiyan, Tu, Uyghur, etc.), Ladakh, Thailand, Vietnam (Mang), Korea, Japan, Paraguay (Alto Parana), Ireland
A13
A13a - Thailand (Khon Mueang from Chiang Rai Province and Lampang Province), China
A13b
A13b1 - Uyghur, Taiwan
A13b2 - China (Lahu, etc.), Thailand (Red Lahu from Mae Hong Son Province), Vietnam (Phù Lá)
A13b2a - China (Naxi), Thailand (Lisu from Mae Hong Son Province)
A14 – Russia (Altai Kizhi, etc.), Kyrgyz (Artux), Uyghur, China, Han Chinese (Denver), Taiwan, Thailand (Lawa from Chiang Mai Province, Mon from Lopburi Province), Vietnam (Pa Then)
A15 – Uyghur
A15a – China (Han in Beijing, Lanzhou, etc.), Tibet (Tingri), Uyghur, Japan
A15b – China, Japan (Ehime)
A15c – China
A15c1 – Naxi, Tibet (Sherpa), Nepal (Sherpa)
A16 – Buryat, Uyghur, Turk
A17 – China (Han from Beijing, Lanzhou, etc.), Miao, Yi, Tibet (Lhoba, Monpa, Tingri), Ladakh, Kyrgyz (Tashkurgan), Thailand (Lawa from Chiang Mai Province and Mae Hong Son Province, Blang from Chiang Rai Province, Mon from Ratchaburi Province), Vietnam (Phù Lá, Hà Nhì)
A18 – Japan, China (Han from Fujian, Han from Beijing, Han from Lanzhou</ref>), Romania
A19 – China (Han from Beijing, etc.)
A20 – Japan, Han Chinese (Denver)
A21 – Tibet (Sherpa, Deng, etc.), Jammu and Kashmir
A22 – China, Han Chinese (Denver)
A24 – China (Han in Beijing), Turkey, Czech Republic (West Bohemia)
A25 – Japan (Chiba), China, Yakut (Vilyuy River basin)
A26 – Denmark
A3 – Japan (Tokyo, etc.), Korea [TMRCA 6,800 (95% CI 3,200 <-> 12,600) ybp]
A3a – Japan (Aichi, etc.) [TMRCA 4,300 (95% CI 1,400 <-> 9,800) ybp]
A7 [TMRCA 8,800 (95% CI 5,400 <-> 13,500) ybp]
A7* – China
A7a – Tibet [TMRCA 7,000 (95% CI 3,900 <-> 11,700) ybp]
A7a* – Lhoba
A7a1 – Lhoba
A7a2 – Lhoba, Monpa
A7b – Japan (Tokyo, etc.) [TMRCA 6,300 (95% CI 2,100 <-> 14,700) ybp]
A9
A11 – Nepal, Korea, Russia [TMRCA 14,500 (95% CI 9,700 <-> 20,800) ybp]
A11a – Tibet (Lhasa, Nyingchi, Tingri, Sherpa, Lhoba, etc.), Ladakh
A11b – Tibet (Tingri, Chamdo, etc.), Naxi, Han (Yunnan)
A5 – China (incl. Hong Kong), Japan [TMRCA 16,200 (95% CI 11,100 <-> 22,800) ybp]
A5a – Japan (Tokyo, Aichi, etc.), Korea, China [TMRCA 5,500 (95% CI 3,800 <-> 7,600) ybp]
A5a1 - Korea
A5a1a – Japan (Tokyo, etc.), Korea
A5a1a1 – Japan (Tokyo, Chiba, Aichi, etc.), Korea
A5a1a1a – Japan (Tokyo, etc.)
A5a1a1b – Japan (Tokyo, Chiba, etc.), Korea
A5a1a2 – Japan, Korea
A5a1a2a – Japan (Aichi)
A5a1b – Japan (Tokyo, Aichi)
A5a2 – Japan (Tokyo, Aichi, etc.)
A5a3
A5a3* – Korea, USA (African American)
A5a3a
A5a3a* – Japan (Tokyo)
A5a3a1 – Japan (Tokyo, Aichi, etc.)
A5a4 – Japan
A5a5 – Japan, South Korea (Seoul), Uyghur
A5b – China (Tujia, Hui, etc.) [TMRCA 12,800 ybp (95% CI 8,400 <-> 18,800) ybp]
A5b1 – China (Han from Beijing, etc.), Japan, Korea, Uyghur, Thailand, Vietnam (Tay), Singapore [TMRCA 8,600 (95% CI 6,600 <-> 11,100) ybp]
A5b1* – Uyghur
A5b1a – Japan (Tokyo, etc.), Korea [TMRCA 6,700 (95% CI 3,700 <-> 11,300) ybp]
A5b1b – China (Han from Fujian, Miao, etc.), Uyghur, Korea [TMRCA 7,300 (95% CI 5,600 <-> 9,400) ybp]
A5b1b* – Han Chinese
A5b1b1
A5b1b1* – Miao
A5b1b1a – China
A5b1b1b – China
A5b1b2 – Uyghur
A5b1c – Han Chinese (Denver) [TMRCA 7,600 (95% CI 3,100 <-> 15,500) ybp]
A5b1c1 – Taiwan (Hakka, Bunun, Paiwan) [TMRCA 5,400 (95% CI 1,800 <-> 12,600) ybp]
A5b1d [TMRCA 7,300 (95% CI 3,700 <-> 13,000) ybp] 
A5b1d* – China
A5b1d1 – Siamese (Central Thailand), Tay (Vietnam)
A5b2 – China (Tujia, etc.)
A5c – Japan (Aichi, etc.), Korea, Khamnigan, Buryat, Barghut [TMRCA 8,200 (95% CI 4,800 <-> 13,000) ybp]
A5c1 – Japan (Tokyo, Chiba, Aichi, etc.)
A8 – Uyghur [TMRCA 14,000 (95% CI 9,500 <-> 19,800) ybp]
A8a – Okunev culture, Ket, Selkup, Pakistan, Poland, Italy [TMRCA 11,000 (95% CI 8,000 <-> 14,800) ybp]
A8a* – Han Chinese (Guizhou), Korean
A8a1 – Hungary, Albania [TMRCA 5,500 (95% CI 3,000 <-> 9,200) ybp]
A8a1* - Uyghur, Poland (Podhale), USA (Louisiana)
A8a1a - Yakut, Uyghur, Buryat
A8a2
A8a2a – Kets (Kellog, etc.), Tofalar (Alygdzher) [TMRCA 2,200 (95% CI 125 <-> 12,000) ybp]
A8a2b - Tuvan (Bay-Tal), Poland
A8b – Koryak [TMRCA 1,050 (95% CI 75 <-> 5,600) ybp]
A10 – China (Uyghur), Afghanistan (Hazara, Uzbek), Russia (Mansi, Volga Tatars, etc.), France, Canada, New York [TMRCA 9,200 (95% CI 4,900 <-> 15,600) ybp]

Popular culture
The mummy "Juanita" of Peru, also called the "Ice Maiden", has been shown to belong to mitochondrial haplogroup A.

In his popular book The Seven Daughters of Eve, Bryan Sykes named the originator of this mtDNA haplogroup Aiyana.

Eva Longoria, an American actress of Mexican descent, belongs to Haplogroup A2.

See also

Genealogical DNA test
Genetic genealogy
Human mitochondrial genetics
Population genetics
Indigenous Amerindian genetics

References

External links
General
Ian Logan's Mitochondrial DNA Site
Mannis van Oven's Phylotree
Haplogroup A
Beringian Standstill and Spread of Native American Founders (PLoS)
Spread of Haplogroup A, from National Geographic
Aiyana
A10 Ancient DNA – Ancient Chumash Paleoasiatic remains. A10 haplogroup assignment. www.pcas.org/assets/docu Results of Mitochondrial DNA Analyses from Monterey County, California
A10 (( A10 ancient America sample.......Chumash documented origin, Cayegues (Kayiwish) Coastal Paleoasiatic California Indian populations, John R. Johnson, Anthropology 131CA http://www.anth.ucsb.edu/classes/anth131ca/California%20Genetic%20Prehistory.pdf
A10 In the Johnson & Lorenz (2006) study, case JJ168 (haploTYPE A10), does not qualify the PhyloTree.org criteria to be classified as belonging to haploGROUP A10. In HVR1 (the only region their research tested), JJ168 does not present criterion mutations 16227c nor 16311.

A